Brandon Kenneth Lewis  (born 20 June 1971) is a British politician who served as Secretary of State for Justice and Lord Chancellor from September to October 2022. He previously served as Chairman of the Conservative Party from 2018 to 2019 and Secretary of State for Northern Ireland from 2020 to 2022. A member of the Conservative Party, he has been Member of Parliament (MP) for Great Yarmouth since 2010. 

Born in Harold Wood, London, Lewis attended the independent Forest School. He studied economics at the University of Buckingham, switching to King's College London for his master's degree. He then began a career as a barrister. He was a councillor on Brentwood Borough Council from 1998 to 2009 and served as leader of the council from 2004 to 2009. He was elected for Great Yarmouth at the 2010 general election.

Lewis served under Prime Minister David Cameron as Parliamentary Under-Secretary of State for Communities and Local Government from 2012 to 2014 and Minister of State for Housing and Planning from 2014 to 2016. Lewis served under Cameron’s successor, Theresa May, as Minister of State for Policing and the Fire Service from 2016 to 2017 and Minister of State for Immigration from 2017 to 2018. He was appointed to May’s Cabinet as Chairman of the Conservative Party and Minister without Portfolio in the 2018 cabinet reshuffle. After May resigned in 2019, Lewis was appointed Minister of State for Security and Deputy for EU Exit and No Deal Preparation by Prime Minister Boris Johnson. In the 2020 cabinet reshuffle, he was promoted by Johnson to Secretary of State for Northern Ireland. He resigned from this post during the July 2022 government crisis. Following the appointment of Liz Truss as Prime Minister, Lewis was appointed as Lord Chancellor and Secretary of State for Justice.

Early life and career
Lewis was born on 20 June 1971 in Harold Wood in London. He was educated at Forest School in Walthamstow. He received a BSc degree in Economics from the University of Buckingham, an LLB honours degree in Law from the same institution, and an LLM in Commercial Law from King's College London. He was called to the bar by the Inner Temple.

He was a director of Woodlands Schools Limited, a provider of private primary schools based in Hutton, Essex, until September 2012 when he resigned his position.

Local government
In May 1998 Lewis was first elected as a representative of the Conservative Party when he became a Borough Councillor for Hutton South on Brentwood Borough Council.

He stood unsuccessfully as the Conservative Party candidate for election in the Sherwood constituency in the 2001 general election; he lost to Paddy Tipping, the Labour Party candidate, with 34% of the vote. 

He was re-elected to Brentwood Borough Council 2002 and 2006 with an increased vote share. He later became Conservative Group leader in 2002 and leader of the council in 2004, after his party took control of the local authority. He remained in this position until 2009, when he resigned as a councillor in Essex to focus on seeking election as an MP in Norfolk.

During his time as leader of the council he co-hosted The Eric and Brandon Show with local MP Eric Pickles on Phoenix FM, a local radio station in Brentwood.

Parliamentary career

Early parliamentary career
In 2006, Lewis was selected as Conservative prospective parliamentary candidate in the Great Yarmouth constituency; he was elected at the 2010 general election, defeating sitting Labour MP Tony Wright with a majority of just over 4000 – a swing to the Conservatives of 8.7% in the seat which was number 66 on their list of target seats. Lewis had stood for Parliament on a "clean expenses pledge", pledging to be "completely open about my expenses".

Lewis served on the Work and Pensions Select Committee and the Regulatory Reform Select Committee from his election until 2012. He has been a member of a number of all-party parliamentary groups, including time as the chair of the Local Growth group and co-chair of a group discussing coastal erosion. A report by the Local Growth group in September 2012, when it was chaired by Lewis, criticised the Government for an "uncoordinated" approach to its Local Enterprise Partnership policy which, according to Lewis, left "gaps and weaknesses".

In 2010–2011 Lewis claimed just over £15,000 in accommodation expenses and in 2011–12 and 2012–13 he claimed just under £21,500 for accommodation.

In the House of Commons he previously sat on the Work and Pensions Committee and the Regulatory Reform Committee.

Lewis has run a variety of campaigns as Member of Parliament for Great Yarmouth. Campaigns have included opposing the removal of free bus passes for school children in Belton & Burgh Castle, cutting fuel duty, protecting Norfolk bus services, and improving Great Yarmouth railway station.

Early ministerial career
In September 2012 Lewis was appointed Parliamentary Under-Secretary of State at the Department for Communities and Local Government, working under Eric Pickles. In July 2014, Lewis was promoted to Minister of State for Housing and Planning, when the prime minister brought the portfolios of Housing and Planning together for the first time under his premiership. He claimed that there had been a "dramatic swing" in public opinion – with almost half of people now in favour of new housing in their area. This related to the new National Planning Policy Framework, the primary framework for town planning in the country, which some argued made it substantially easier for developers to build on greenfield land.

As the local MP, Lewis declined initially to support local campaigners who were fighting against the Conservative run county council's controversial plans for the proposed King's Lynn incinerator. By 2012 he had joined all fellow local MPs in expressing concern with the proposal and, after a change in leadership of the county council, the plans for the incinerator were dropped in 2014.

Lewis previously sat on the House of Commons Speaker's Committee on the Electoral Commission.

In 2013 Lewis was critical of local councils, including many Conservative run councils, planning council tax rises in 2013 against the wishes of the Government, saying that there was "still massive scope" for councils to cut "waste and inefficiency". He has also criticised the Local Government Association for producing proposals to give local councils more freedom over their levels of council tax in the future.

Labour MPs called upon IPSA to investigate whether Lewis was using taxpayer funds for inappropriate political purposes after it was revealed that he had claimed £37,000 for "research briefing and other parliamentary associated assistance" to a political campaign consultancy.

In August 2015, it was reported that Lewis claimed £31,000 of hotel expenses over a two-year period following stays at the Park Plaza hotel near Parliament. Lewis stated that he opted to stay in London rather than travel home to Essex and all the claims complied with parliamentary rules.

In January 2016, the Labour Party unsuccessfully proposed an amendment in Parliament that would have required private landlords to make their homes "fit for human habitation". According to Parliament's register of interests, Lewis was one of 72 Conservative MPs who voted against the amendment who personally derived an income from renting out property. The Conservative Government had responded to the amendment that they believed homes should be fit for human habitation but did not want to pass the new law that would explicitly require it.

He supported the United Kingdom remaining a member of the European Union in the 2016 EU membership referendum. In July 2016, Lewis was promoted to be the minister of state for the Home Office with a portfolio including Police and Fire services, as well as Europol and Interpol.

Following the Grenfell disaster, Lewis was criticised for having rejected calls to increase fire safety regulations in his former role as housing minister. He had argued that legislating to mandate sprinklers in high rise buildings was the wrong approach as water-based sprinklers were inappropriate for electrical fires.

Chairman of the Conservative Party
In a January 2018 cabinet reshuffle, Lewis was promoted to Chairman of the Conservative Party, succeeding Patrick McLoughlin. Lewis was also appointed Minister without Portfolio.

On 19 July, Government Chief Whip Julian Smith was reported to be resisting calls to resign his position, following allegations that he had instructed five Conservative Party MPs to break "pairing" agreements in an important parliamentary vote the previous day. Lewis was the only one to comply with the instruction. Subsequent reports indicated that Smith had given similar instructions to five MPs, but that Lewis had been the only one willing to break what one commentator described later as "a centuries old 'code of honour'". Before it became known that the affair had involved approaches by Smith to more than one MP, the prime minister Theresa May backed Lewis by stating that "The breaking of the pair was done in error. It wasn't good enough and will not be repeated."

In 2019, Lewis voted for May's Brexit withdrawal agreement.

In July 2019, Lewis was appointed Minister of State for Security and Deputy for EU Exit and No Deal Preparation by new Prime Minister Boris Johnson.

Secretary of State for Northern Ireland
In February 2020 he moved to be the secretary of state for Northern Ireland as part of a cabinet reshuffle under Johnson.

He robustly defended the Government's support for the Northern Ireland Protocol. Lewis also responded to the COVID-19 pandemic in Northern Ireland.

In September 2020, Lewis provoked controversy when he conceded that a bill designed to amend the United Kingdom's withdrawal agreement with the European Union would "break international law" in a "specific and limited way".

On 6 July 2022, Lewis told Johnson he needed to step down from office due to a loss in support, during the July 2022 government crisis. Lewis resigned on 7 July, after turning down offers of promotion from Johnson, saying the Government was no longer upholding "honesty, integrity and mutual respect".

Between Ministries
Lewis ran Nadhim Zahawi's campaign in the July 2022 Conservative Party leadership election. After Zahawi was eliminated from the contest, Lewis endorsed Liz Truss's leadership bid.

Lord Chancellor and Secretary of State for Justice
Lewis was appointed Lord Chancellor and Secretary of State for Justice on 6 September 2022 after Liz Truss became the prime minister.

On 29 September, Lewis negotiated a deal with the Criminal Bar Association to end the 2022 British barristers' industrial action. The deal included a 15% increase in legal aid fees to cases in the Crown Court, £3,000,000 of funding for case preparation and £4,000,000 for prerecorded cross-examinations of vulnerable victims and witnesses. On 10 October, 57% of barristers voted to end the strike and Crown Court cases began to be heard as normal from 11 October.

Return to the backbenches 
On 25 October 2022, Lewis resigned from the front bench upon the ascension of Rishi Sunak to the Prime Ministership and returned to the backbenches. He was succeeded as Justice Secretary by Dominic Raab.

Personal life
Lewis married Justine Rappolt in 1999; the couple have two children. He completed the London Marathon in 2005 and 2008 and lists triathlon as an interest. He is a member of the Carlton Club.

Honours

On 29 September 2016, Lewis was sworn in to the Privy Council of the United Kingdom, giving him the honorific title "The Right Honourable" for life. In the 2019 Prime Minister's Resignation Honours, he was appointed a Commander of the Order of the British Empire (CBE) for political and public service in September 2019.

Notes

References

External links
Official website
Great Yarmouth Conservatives

|-

|-

|-

|-

|-

|-

|-

|-

|-

|-

|-

|-

1971 births
Alumni of the University of Buckingham
Alumni of King's College London
Brentwood councillors
Conservative Party (UK) MPs for English constituencies
Ministers of State for Housing (UK)
Chairmen of the Conservative Party (UK)
Secretaries of State for Northern Ireland
Living people
Members of the Privy Council of the United Kingdom
People educated at Forest School, Walthamstow
People from Harold Wood
Politics of the Borough of Great Yarmouth
UK MPs 2010–2015
UK MPs 2015–2017
UK MPs 2017–2019
UK MPs 2019–present
Commanders of the Order of the British Empire
Secretaries of State for Justice (UK)
Lord chancellors of Great Britain
Free Enterprise Group